Tritia is a genus of sea snails, marine gastropod mollusks in the family Nassariidae, the Nassa mud snails or dog whelks.

Species
Species within the genus Tritia include:

 † Tritia albrechti Stein, 2019 
 † Tritia andersoni (F. Nordsieck, 1972) 
 † Tritia andonae (Bellardi, 1882) 
 † Tritia aquitanica (Mayer, 1858) 
 † Tritia aturensis (Peyrot, 1925) 
 † Tritia basteroti (Michelotti, 1847) 
 † Tritia bocholtensis (Beyrich, 1854) 
 Tritia burchardi (Philippi, 1849)
 Tritia caboverdensis (Rolán, 1984)
 Tritia cancellarioides (F. Nordsieck, 1972) 
 Tritia catullorum T. Cossignani, 2021
 † Tritia cestasensis'' (Peyrot, 1925) 
 † Tritia cimbrica (Ravn, 1907) 
 Tritia conspersa (Philippi, 1849)
 Tritia coralligena (Pallary, 1900)
 Tritia corniculum (Olivi, 1792)
 Tritia crassispiralis (van Voorthuysen, 1944) †
 Tritia cuvierii (Payraudeau, 1826)
 † Tritia degrangei (Peyrot, 1925)
 † Tritia denselineata (Nagao, 1928) 
 Tritia denticulata (A. Adams, 1852)
 Tritia djerbaensis Aissaoui, Galindo, Puillandre & Bouchet, 2017
 Tritia edlaueri (Beer-Bistricky, 1958) †
 Tritia elata (Gould, 1845)
 Tritia elongata (Bucquoy, Dautzenberg & Dollfus, 1882)
 Tritia ephamilla (Watson, 1882)
 † Tritia facki (Koenen, 1872) 
 Tritia frigens (Martens, 1878)
 † Tritia gallica (Peyrot, 1925) 
 † Tritia gestroi (Hornung, 1920) 
 Tritia gibbosula (Linnaeus, 1758)
 † Tritia girondica (Peyrot, 1925) 
 Tritia goreensis (Maltzan, 1884)
 Tritia grana (Lamarck, 1822)
 † Tritia hemmoorica Stein, 2019 
 Tritia heynemanni (Maltzan, 1884)
 † Tritia incommodans (Peyrot, 1925) 
 Tritia incrassata (Strøm, 1768)
 † Tritia infralaevis (Fischer in Wanner, 1927) 
 † Tritia jyllandica Stein, 2019 
 † Tritia karinwienrichae Stein, 2019 
 † Tritia karoroensis (Maxwell, 1988) 
 †Tritia karreri'' (R. Hoernes & Auinger, 1882) 
 † Tritia kostejana (O. Boettger, 1902) 
 Tritia lanceolata (Bucquoy, Dautzenberg & Dollfus, 1882)
 † Tritia latestriata (Kautsky, 1925) 
 † Tritia levensauensis (Hinsch, 1987) 
 Tritia lima (Dillwyn, 1817)
 † Tritia longitesta (Beer-Bistrický, 1958) 
 Tritia louisi (Pallary, 1912)
 † Tritia mancietensis (Peyrot, 1925) 
 Tritia miga (Bruguière, 1789)
 † Tritia miniridibunda Lozouet, 2021 
 † Tritia mostafavii Stein, 2019 
 Tritia mothsi Stein, 2019 
 Tritia mutabilis (Linnaeus, 1758)
 Tritia neritea (Linnaeus, 1758)
 Tritia nitida (Jeffreys, 1867)
 † Tritia oblonga (Sasso, 1827) 
 † Tritia occidentalis (Peyrot, 1925) 
 Tritia ovoidea (Locard, 1886)
 Tritia pallaryana Aissaoui, Galindo, Puillandre & Bouchet, 2017
 Tritia pellucida (Risso, 1826)
 † Tritia pelouatensis (Peyrot, 1925) 
 Tritia pfeifferi (Philippi, 1844)
 † Tritia praebasteroti Lozouet, 2021 
 † Tritia producta (Bellardi, 1882) 
 † Tritia pygmaea (Schlotheim, 1820) 
 Tritia recidiva (von Martens, 1876)
 †Tritia recta (Dollfus & Dautzenberg, 1886) 
 † Tritia rejecta (O. Boettger, 1906) 
 † Tritia recta (Dollfus & Dautzenberg, 1886) 
 Tritia reticulata (Linnaeus, 1758)
 † Tritia ridibunda (Lozouet, 1999) 
 † Tritia ronaldjansseni'' (Schnetler, 2005) 
 † Tritia rozieri (Peyrot, 1925) 
 † Tritia saucatsensis (Peyrot, 1925) 
 † Tritia schlotheimi (Beyrich, 1854) 
 † Tritia schoenni (R. Hoernes & Auinger, 1882) 
 † Tritia schroederi (Kautsky, 1925) 
 Tritia senegalensis (Maltzan, 1884)
 † Tritia separabilis (Laws, 1939) 
 † Tritia serraticosta (Bronn, 1831) 
 Tritia sinusigera (A. Adams, 1852)
 Tritia siquijorensis (A. Adams, 1852)
 † Tritia slieswicia (Rasmussen, 1966) 
 † Tritia socialis (Hutton, 1886) 
 † Tritia sorgenfreii Stein, 2019 
 † Tritia sororcula (Peyrot, 1925) 
 † Tritia spectabilis (Nyst, 1845) 
 Tritia stephanensis (Peyrot, 1925) †
 † Tritia subincognita (Lozouet, 1999) 
 † Tritia substraminea (Grateloup, 1834) 
 † Tritia subtessellata (Peyrot, 1925) 
 † Tritia syltensis (Beyrich, 1854) 
 Tritia tavernai T. Cossignani, 2018
 Tritia tenuicosta (Bucquoy, Dautzenberg & Dollfus, 1882)
 † Tritia tenuistriata (Beyrich, 1854) 
 Tritia tinei (Maravigna, 1840)
 Tritia tingitana (Pallary, 1901)
 Tritia trivittata (Say, 1822)
 Tritia turulosa (Risso, 1826)
 † Tritia twistringensis (A. W. Janssen, 1972) 
 Tritia unifasciata (Kiener, 1834)
 Tritia varicosa (W. Turton, 1825)
 Tritia vaucheri (Pallary, 1906)
 Tritia vincenzoi T. Cossignani, 2021
 † Tritia voorthuyseni (Janse & A. W. Janssen, 1983) 
 † Tritia westfalica Stein, 2019 
 † Tritia wienrichi (Gürs, 2002) 

 Species brought into synonymy 
 Tritia alba (Say, 1826): synonym of Phrontis alba (Say, 1826)
 Tritia casta (Gould, 1850): synonym of Nassarius castus (Gould, 1850)
 Tritia erythraea (Issel, 1869): synonym of Reticunassa erythraea (Issel, 1869)
 Tritia (Hinia) festivus (Powys, 1835): synonym of Nassarius festivus (Powys, 1835): synonym of Reticunassa festiva (Powys, 1835)
 Tritia (Reticunassa) dermestina (Gould, 1860): synonym of Nassarius pauperus (Gould, 1850): synonym of Nassarius pauper (Gould, 1850): synonym of Reticunassa paupera (Gould, 1850)
 Tritia (Reticunassa) hiradoensis (Pilsbry, 1904): synonym of Nassarius fraterculus (Dunker, 1860)
 Tritia (Tritonella) crenulicostata Shuto, 1969: synonym of Nassarius crenulicostatus (Shuto, 1969): synonym of Reticunassa crenulicostata (Shuto, 1969)
 Tritia (Varicinassa) variciferus (A. Adams, 1852): synonym of Nassarius variciferus (A. Adams, 1852)
 Tritia festiva (Powys, 1835): synonym of Nassarius festivus (Powys, 1835): synonym of Reticunassa festiva (Powys, 1835)
 Tritia fratercula (Dunker, 1860): synonym of Nassarius fraterculus (Dunker, 1860)
 Tritia obsoleta (Say, 1822): synonym of Ilyanassa obsoleta (Say, 1822)
 Tritia pygmaea (Lamarck, 1822): synonym of Tritia varicosa (W. Turton, 1825)
 Tritia reticulata: synonym of Nassarius reticulatus (Linnaeus, 1758)
 Tritia swearingeni (Petuch & R. F. Myers, 2014): synonym of Nassarius swearingeni Petuch & R. F. Myers, 2014
 Tritia vitiensis (Hombron & Jacquinot, 1848): synonym of Nassarius vitiensis (Hombron & Jacquinot, 1848)
 Tritia websteri (Petuch & Sargent, 2012): synonym of Nassarius websteri Petuch & Sargent, 2012
 Tritia westerlundi (Brusina, 1900): synonym of Tritia neritea (Linnaeus, 1758)
 † Tritia wilsoni (Ludbrook, 1978): synonym of † Nassarius wilsoni (Ludbrook, 1978)

List of synonyms of the genus

 Alectrion (Hima) Leach in Gray, 1852 
 Alectrion (Tritia) A. Adams, 1853 
 Amycla H. Adams & A. Adams, 1853 
 Amyclina Iredale, 1918 (unnecessary replacement name for Amycla H. & A. Adams, 1853 )
 Cencus Gistel, 1848
 Cyclonassa Swainson, 1840 (Objective synonym of Cyclope)
 Cyclope Risso, 1826
 Cyclops Montfort, 1810 (Invalid: junior homonym of Cyclops O.F. Müller, 1785 [Crustacea]; Cencus Gistel, 1848 is a replacement name)
 † Fackia Nordsieck, 1972 
 Hima Leach in Gray, 1852 
 † Hima (Mirua) Marwick, 1931 
 Hinia Leach, 1847
 Hinia (Reticunassa)  Iredale, 1936
 Hinia (Telasco) H. Adams & A. Adams, 1853
 Hinia (Tritonella) A. Adams, 1852 
 Ilyanassa  Stimpson, 1865
 † Mirua Marwick, 1931 
 Nana Schumacher, 1817 (Invalid: Placed on the Official Index by ICZN Opinion 793)
 Nanina Risso, 1826
 Nassa (Amycla) H. Adams & A. Adams, 1853 
 Nassa (Gussonea) Monterosato, 1912 
 Nassa (Hima) Leach in Gray, 1852 
 Nassa (Hinia) Gray, 1847 
 Nassa (Telasco) H. Adams & A. Adams, 1853 
 Nassa (Tritia) A. Adams, 1853 
 Nassa (Tritonella) A. Adams, 1852 
 Nassa (Uzita) H. Adams & A. Adams, 1853 
 Nassarius (Amyclina) Iredale, 1918
 Nassarius (Cryptonassarius) Cernohorsky, 1975
 Nassarius (Cyclope) Risso, 1826
 Nassarius (Cyclops) Montfort, 1810
 Nassarius (Gussonea) Monterosato, 1912 
 Nassarius (Hima) Leach in Gray, 1852 
 Nassarius (Hinia) Leach, 1847
 Nassarius (Ilyanassa)  Stimpson, 1865
 † Nassarius (Miohinia) Nordsieck, 1972 
 Nassarius (Mirua) Marwick, 1931
 Nassarius (Naytiopsis) Thiele, 1929
 Nassarius (Neritula) H. Adams & A. Adams, 1853 
 † Nassarius (Paranassa) Conrad, 1867 
 Nassarius (Parcanassa)  Iredale, 1936
 Nassarius (Reticunassa)  Iredale, 1936
 Nassarius (Telasco) H. Adams & A. Adams, 1853 
 Nassarius (Tritia) A. Adams, 1853 
 Nassarius (Tritonella) A. Adams, 1852 
 Nassarius (Usita) (incorrect subsequent spelling)
 Nassarius (Uzita) H. Adams & A. Adams, 1853 
 Naytiopsis Thiele, 1929
 Neritula H. Adams & A. Adams, 1853  (Objective synonym of Cyclope)
 Panormella O. G. Costa, 1840
 Parcanassa  Iredale, 1936
 Proneritula Thiele, 1929
 Tarazeuxis  Iredale, 1936
 Telasco H. &  A. Adams, 1853 
 Tritia (Hinia) Tritia (Reticunassa)  Iredale, 1936
 Tritia (Tritonella) A. Adams, 1852 
 Tritonella A. Adams, 1852 
 Uzita H. Adams & A. Adams, 1853 
 Zeuxis (Tarazeuxis)  Iredale, 1936

References

 Risso, A. (1826). Histoire naturelle des principales productions de l'Europe Méridionale et particulièrement de celles des environs de Nice et des Alpes Maritimes. Paris: F.G. Levrault. 4: IV, 1-439, 12 pls
 Galindo L.A., Puillandre N., Utge J., Lozouet P. & Bouchet P. (2016). The phylogeny and systematics of the Nassariidae revisited (Gastropoda, Buccinoidea)''. Molecular Phylogenetics and Evolution. 99: 337–353.

External links

 
Gastropod genera